Ptereleotris is a genus of dartfishes found in the Atlantic, Indian and Pacific oceans.

Species
There are currently 20 recognized species in this genus:
 Ptereleotris arabica J. E. Randall & Hoese, 1985
 Ptereleotris brachyptera J. E. Randall & T. Suzuki, 2008 (Lowfin dartfish)
 Ptereleotris caeruleomarginata G. R. Allen, Erdmann & Cahyani, 2012 (Bluemargin dartfish)
 Ptereleotris calliura (D. S. Jordan & C. H. Gilbert, 1882) (Blue goby)
 Ptereleotris carinata W. A. Bussing, 2001 (Panamic dartfish)
 Ptereleotris crossogenion J. E. Randall & T. Suzuki, 2008 (Fringechin dartfish)
 Ptereleotris evides (D. S. Jordan & C. L. Hubbs, 1925) (Blackfin dartfish)
 Ptereleotris grammica J. E. Randall & Lubbock, 1982 (Lined dartfish)
 Ptereleotris hanae (D. S. Jordan & Snyder, 1901) (Blue hana goby)
 Ptereleotris helenae (J. E. Randall, 1968) (Hovering goby)
 Ptereleotris heteroptera (Bleeker, 1855) (Blacktail goby)
 Ptereleotris kallista J. E. Randall & T. Suzuki, 2008 (Beautiful Dartfish)
 Ptereleotris lineopinnis (Fowler, 1935) (Sad glider)
 Ptereleotris melanopogon J. E. Randall & Hoese, 1985
 Ptereleotris microlepis (Bleeker, 1856) (Blue gudgeon)
 Ptereleotris monoptera J. E. Randall & Hoese, 1985 (Lyre-tail dart-goby)
 Ptereleotris randalli Gasparini, L. A. Rocha & Floeter, 2001 (Brazilian dartfish)
 Ptereleotris rubristigma G. R. Allen, Erdmann & Cahyani, 2012 (Redspot dartfish)
 Ptereleotris uroditaenia J. E. Randall & Hoese, 1985 (Flagtail dartfish)
 Ptereleotris zebra (Fowler, 1938) (Chinese zebra goby)

References

 
Microdesmidae
Gobiidae